Multi-factor authentication (MFA; encompassing two-factor authentication, or 2FA, along with similar terms) is an electronic authentication method in which a user is granted access to a website or application only after successfully presenting two or more pieces of evidence (or factors) to an authentication mechanism: knowledge (something only the user knows), possession (something only the user has), and inherence (something only the user is). MFA protects user data—which may include personal identification or financial assets—from being accessed by an unauthorized third party that may have been able to discover, for example, a single password.

A third-party authenticator (TPA) app enables two-factor authentication, usually by showing a randomly generated and frequently changing code to use for authentication.

Factors 

Authentication takes place when someone tries to log into a computer resource (such as a network, device, or application). The resource requires the user to supply the identity by which the user is known to the resource, along with evidence of the authenticity of the user's claim to that identity. Simple authentication requires only one such piece of evidence (factor), typically a password. For additional security, the resource may require more than one factor—multi-factor authentication, or two-factor authentication in cases where exactly two pieces of evidence are to be supplied.

The use of multiple authentication factors to prove one's identity is based on the premise that an unauthorized actor is unlikely to be able to supply the factors required for access. If, in an authentication attempt, at least one of the components is missing or supplied incorrectly, the user's identity is not established with sufficient certainty and access to the asset (e.g., a building, or data) being protected by multi-factor authentication then remains blocked. The authentication factors of a multi-factor authentication scheme may include:

 Something the user has: Any physical object in the possession of the user, such as a security token (USB stick), a bank card, a key, etc.
 Something the user knows: Certain knowledge only known to the user, such as a password, PIN, etc.
 Something the user is: Some physical characteristic of the user (biometrics), such as a fingerprint, eye iris, voice, typing speed, pattern in key press intervals, etc.

An example of two-factor authentication is the withdrawing of money from an ATM; only the correct combination of a bank card (something the user possesses) and a PIN (something the user knows) allows the transaction to be carried out. Two other examples are to supplement a user-controlled password with a one-time password (OTP) or code generated or received by an authenticator (e.g. a security token or smartphone) that only the user possesses.

A third-party authenticator app enables two-factor authentication in a different way, usually by showing a randomly generated and constantly refreshing code which the user can use, rather than sending an SMS or using another method. A big benefit of these apps is that they usually continue to work even without an internet connection. Examples of third-party authenticator apps include Google Authenticator, Authy and Microsoft Authenticator; some password managers such as LastPass offer the service as well.

Knowledge 

Knowledge factors are a form of authentication. In this form, the user is required to prove knowledge of a secret in order to authenticate.

A password is a secret word or string of characters that is used for user authentication. This is the most commonly used mechanism of authentication. Many multi-factor authentication techniques rely on passwords as one factor of authentication. Variations include both longer ones formed from multiple words (a passphrase) and the shorter, purely numeric, PIN commonly used for ATM access. Traditionally, passwords are expected to be memorized.

Possession 

Possession factors ("something only the user has") have been used for authentication for centuries, in the form of a key to a lock. The basic principle is that the key embodies a secret that is shared between the lock and the key, and the same principle underlies possession factor authentication in computer systems. A security token is an example of a possession factor.

Disconnected tokens have no connections to the client computer. They typically use a built-in screen to display the generated authentication data, which is manually typed in by the user. This type of token mostly uses a OTP that can only be used for that specific session.

Connected tokens are devices that are physically connected to the computer to be used. Those devices transmit data automatically. There are a number of different types, including USB tokens, smart cards and wireless tags. Increasingly, FIDO2 capable tokens, supported by the FIDO Alliance and the World Wide Web Consortium (W3C), have become popular with mainstream browser support beginning in 2015.

A software token (a.k.a. soft token) is a type of two-factor authentication security device that may be used to authorize the use of computer services. Software tokens are stored on a general-purpose electronic device such as a desktop computer, laptop, PDA, or mobile phone and can be duplicated. (Contrast hardware tokens, where the credentials are stored on a dedicated hardware device and therefore cannot be duplicated, absent physical invasion of the device.)  A soft token may not be a device the user interacts with. Typically an X.509v3 certificate is loaded onto the device and stored securely to serve this purpose.

Multi-factor authentication also has application in physical security systems. These physical security systems are known and commonly referred to as access control. Multi-factor authentication is typically deployed in access control systems through the use, firstly, of a physical possession (such as a fob, keycard, or QR-code displayed on a device) which acts as the identification credential, and secondly, a validation of one's identity such as facial biometrics or retinal scan. This form of multi-factor authentication is commonly referred to as facial verification or facial authentication.

Inherent 

These are factors associated with the user, and are usually biometric methods, including fingerprint, face, voice, or iris recognition. Behavioral biometrics such as keystroke dynamics can also be used.

Location 

Increasingly, a fourth factor is coming into play involving the physical location of the user.  While hard wired to the corporate network, a user could be allowed to login using only a pin code. Whereas if the user was off the network, entering a code from a soft token as well could be required.  This could be seen as an acceptable standard where access into the office is controlled.

Systems for network admission control work in similar ways where the level of network access can be contingent on the specific network a device is connected to, such as Wi-Fi vs wired connectivity.  This also allows a user to move between offices and dynamically receive the same level of network access in each.

Mobile phone-based authentication 
Two factor authentication over text message was developed as early as 1996, when AT&T described a system for authorizing transactions based on an exchange of codes over two-way pagers.

Many multi-factor authentication vendors offer mobile phone-based authentication. Some methods include push-based authentication, QR code-based authentication, one-time password authentication (event-based and time-based), and SMS-based verification. SMS-based verification suffers from some security concerns. Phones can be cloned, apps can run on several phones and cell-phone maintenance personnel can read SMS texts. Not least, cell phones can be compromised in general, meaning the phone is no longer something only the user has.

The major drawback of authentication including something the user possesses is that the user must carry around the physical token (the USB stick, the bank card, the key or similar), practically at all times. Loss and theft are risks. Many organizations forbid carrying USB and electronic devices in or out of premises owing to malware and data theft risks, and most important machines do not have USB ports for the same reason. Physical tokens usually do not scale, typically requiring a new token for each new account and system. Procuring and subsequently replacing tokens of this kind involves costs. In addition, there are inherent conflicts and unavoidable trade-offs between usability and security.

Two-step authentication involving mobile phones and smartphones provides an alternative to dedicated physical devices. To authenticate, people can use their personal access codes to the device (i.e. something that only the individual user knows) plus a one-time-valid, dynamic passcode, typically consisting of 4 to 6 digits. The passcode can be sent to their mobile device by SMS or can be generated by a one-time passcode-generator app. In both cases, the advantage of using a mobile phone is that there is no need for an additional dedicated token, as users tend to carry their mobile devices around at all times.

Notwithstanding the popularity of SMS verification, security advocates have publicly criticized SMS verification, and in July 2016, a United States NIST draft guideline proposed deprecating it as a form of authentication. A year later NIST reinstated SMS verification as a valid authentication channel in the finalized guideline.

In 2016 and 2017 respectively, both Google and Apple started offering user two-step authentication with push notifications as an alternative method.

Security of mobile-delivered security tokens fully depends on the mobile operator's operational security and can be easily breached by wiretapping or SIM cloning by national security agencies.

Advantages:

 No additional tokens are necessary because it uses mobile devices that are (usually) carried all the time. 
 As they are constantly changed, dynamically generated passcodes are safer to use than fixed (static) log-in information.
 Depending on the solution, passcodes that have been used are automatically replaced in order to ensure that a valid code is always available, transmission/reception problems do not, therefore, prevent logins.

Disadvantages:

 Users may still be susceptible to phishing attacks. An attacker can send a text message that links to a spoofed website that looks identical to the actual website. The attacker can then get the authentication code, user name and password.
A mobile phone is not always available—it can be lost, stolen, have a dead battery, or otherwise not work.
Despite their growing popularity, some users may not even own a mobile device, and take umbrage at being required to own one as a condition of using some service on their home PC.
Mobile phone reception is not always available—large areas, particularly outside of towns, lack coverage.
SIM cloning gives hackers access to mobile phone connections. Social-engineering attacks against mobile-operator companies have resulted in the handing over of duplicate SIM cards to criminals.
Text messages to mobile phones using SMS are insecure and can be intercepted by IMSI-catchers. Thus third parties can steal and use the token.
 Account recovery typically bypasses mobile-phone two-factor authentication.
 Modern smartphones are used both for receiving email and SMS. So if the phone is lost or stolen and is not protected by a password or biometric, all accounts for which the email is the key can be hacked as the phone can receive the second factor. 
 Mobile carriers may charge the user for messaging fees.

Legislation and regulation
The Payment Card Industry (PCI) Data Security Standard, requirement 8.3, requires the use of MFA for all remote network access that originates from outside the network to a Card Data Environment (CDE). Beginning with PCI-DSS version 3.2, the use of MFA is required for all administrative access to the CDE, even if the user is within a trusted network.

European Union
The second Payment Services Directive requires "strong customer authentication" on most electronic payments in the European Economic Area since September 14, 2019.

India
In India, the Reserve Bank of India mandated two-factor authentication for all online transactions made using a debit or credit card using either a password or a one-time password sent over SMS. This was temporarily withdrawn in 2016 for transactions up to ₹2,000 in the wake of the November 2016 banknote demonetisation. Vendors such as Uber have mandated by the bank to amend their payment processing systems in compliance with this two-factor authentication rollout.

United States
Details for authentication for federal employees and contractors in the U.S. are defined in Homeland Security Presidential Directive 12 (HSPD-12).

Existing authentication methodologies involve the explained three types of basic "factors". Authentication methods that depend on more than one factor are more difficult to compromise than single-factor methods.

IT regulatory standards for access to federal government systems require the use of multi-factor authentication to access sensitive IT resources, for example when logging on to network devices to perform administrative tasks and when accessing any computer using a privileged login.

NIST Special Publication 800-63-3 discusses various forms of two-factor authentication and provides guidance on using them in business processes requiring different levels of assurance.

In 2005, the United States' Federal Financial Institutions Examination Council issued guidance for financial institutions recommending financial institutions conduct risk-based assessments, evaluate customer awareness programs, and develop security measures to reliably authenticate customers remotely accessing online financial services, officially recommending the use of authentication methods that depend on more than one factor (specifically, what a user knows, has, and is) to determine the user's identity. In response to the publication, numerous authentication vendors began improperly promoting challenge-questions, secret images, and other knowledge-based methods as "multi-factor" authentication. Due to the resulting confusion and widespread adoption of such methods, on August 15, 2006, the FFIEC published supplemental guidelineswhich state that by definition, a "true" multi-factor authentication system must use distinct instances of the three factors of authentication it had defined, and not just use multiple instances of a single factor.

Security
According to proponents, multi-factor authentication could drastically reduce the incidence of online identity theft and other online fraud, because the victim's password would no longer be enough to give a thief permanent access to their information. However, many multi-factor authentication approaches remain vulnerable to phishing, man-in-the-browser, and man-in-the-middle attacks. Two-factor authentication in web applications are especially susceptible to phishing attacks, particularly in SMS and e-mails, and, as a response, many experts advise users not to share their verification codes with anyone, and many web application providers will place an advisory in an e-mail or SMS containing a code.

Multi-factor authentication may be ineffective against modern threats, like ATM skimming, phishing, and malware.

In May 2017, O2 Telefónica, a German mobile service provider, confirmed that cybercriminals had exploited SS7 vulnerabilities to bypass SMS based two-step authentication to do unauthorized withdrawals from users' bank accounts. The criminals first infected the account holder's computers in an attempt to steal their bank account credentials and phone numbers. Then the attackers purchased access to a fake telecom provider and set up a redirect for the victim's phone number to a handset controlled by them. Finally, the attackers logged into victims' online bank accounts and requested for the money on the accounts to be withdrawn to accounts owned by the criminals. SMS passcodes were routed to phone numbers controlled by the attackers and the criminals transferred the money out.

Implementation 

Many multi-factor authentication products require users to deploy client software to make multi-factor authentication systems work. Some vendors have created separate installation packages for network login, Web access credentials, and VPN connection credentials. For such products, there may be four or five different software packages to push down to the client PC in order to make use of the token or smart card. This translates to four or five packages on which version control has to be performed, and four or five packages to check for conflicts with business applications. If access can be operated using web pages, it is possible to limit the overheads outlined above to a single application. With other multi-factor authentication technology such as hardware token products, no software must be installed by end-users.

There are drawbacks to multi-factor authentication that are keeping many approaches from becoming widespread. Some users have difficulty keeping track of a hardware token or USB plug. Many users do not have the technical skills needed to install a client-side software certificate by themselves. Generally, multi-factor solutions require additional investment for implementation and costs for maintenance. Most hardware token-based systems are proprietary, and some vendors charge an annual fee per user. Deployment of hardware tokens is logistically challenging. Hardware tokens may get damaged or lost, and issuance of tokens in large industries such as banking or even within large enterprises needs to be managed. In addition to deployment costs, multi-factor authentication often carries significant additional support costs. A 2008 survey of over 120 U.S. credit unions by the Credit Union Journal reported on the support costs associated with two-factor authentication. In their report, software certificates and software toolbar approaches were reported to have the highest support costs.

Research into deployments of multi-factor authentication schemes has shown that one of the elements that tend to impact the adoption of such systems is the line of business of the organization that deploys the multi-factor authentication system. Examples cited include the U.S. government, which employs an elaborate system of physical tokens (which themselves are backed by robust Public Key Infrastructure), as well as private banks, which tend to prefer multi-factor authentication schemes for their customers that involve more accessible, less expensive means of identity verification, such as an app installed onto a customer-owned smartphone. Despite the variations that exist among available systems that organizations may have to choose from, once a multi-factor authentication system is deployed within an organization, it tends to remain in place, as users invariably acclimate to the presence and use of the system and embrace it over time as a normalized element of their daily process of interaction with their relevant information system.

While the perception is that multi-factor authentication is within the realm of perfect security, Roger Grimes writes that if not properly implemented and configured, multi-factor authentication can in fact be easily defeated.

Patents 
	
	
In 2013, Kim Dotcom claimed to have invented two-factor authentication in a 2000 patent, and briefly threatened to sue all the major web services. However, the European Patent Office revoked his patent in light of an earlier 1998 U.S. patent held by AT&T.

See also 

 Electronic authentication
 Identity management
 Multi-party authorization
 Mutual authentication
 Reliance authentication
 Strong authentication
 Universal 2nd Factor

References

Further reading

External links 

 Attackers breached the servers of RSA and stole information that could be used to compromise the security of two-factor authentication tokens used by 40 million employees (register.com, 18 Mar 2011)
 Banks to Use Two-factor Authentication by End of 2006, (slashdot.org, 20 Oct 2005)
 Microsoft to abandon passwords, Microsoft preparing to dump passwords in favour of two-factor authentication in forthcoming versions of Windows (vnunet.com, 14 Mar 2005)

Authentication methods
Computer access control